The Cottonwood Creek is a stream in San Diego County, California. It originates in the Cottonwood Creek Park in the town of Encinitas, then flows towards Moonlight Beach, where it discharges into the Pacific Ocean. 

The Cottonwood Creek has been denoted California Point of Historic Interest.

References

Rivers of San Diego County, California
Geography of San Diego
Watersheds of California
Rivers of Southern California